Mackinnonia is a genus of small shelly fossil comprising straight or slightly coiled shells of the helcionelloid type.  The outer surface of their shell is smooth, whereas the inner surface has a net-like ridges. They are known from late Early Cambrian rocks across North America and Greenland.

References 

 Fossil Focus: The place of small shelly fossils in the Cambrian explosion

Helcionellidae
Cambrian animals of North America
Paleozoic life of Newfoundland and Labrador
Paleozoic life of Quebec

Cambrian genus extinctions